Berschbach is a village in the commune of Mersch, in central Luxembourg.  , the village had a population of 150.

External links
Berschbach Homepage

Mersch
Villages in Luxembourg